Wimberley is a village in Hays County, Texas, United States. It is still predominantly a ranching area outside of town. The population was 2,839 at the 2020 census.

History

Wimberley started as a trading post settlement near Cypress Creek in 1848, the year Hays County was organized. After William Carvin Winters built a gristmill at the site in 1856, it took on the name "Winters' Mill". When the mill was sold in 1864 to the Cude family, its name was changed to "Cude's Mill". It was sold again in 1874 to Pleasant Wimberley and took on his name. Over the years, the mill was expanded to process lumber, shingles, flour, molasses, and cotton.

The mill is gone, but Winter's home survives and is listed on the National Register of Historic Places.

In 1880, Alfred vom Stein, a postmaster from San Marcos, applied to have a post office established in the community, calling it "Wimberleyville". The application was granted, but the name shortened to Wimberley. Although the mill was shut down in 1925, the community was established and continued to grow, eventually becoming known as a resort town and becoming popular with tourists. Prior to its incorporation in May 2000, it was a census-designated place (CDP).

On May 25, 2015, the town was hit by flooding during the 2015 Texas–Oklahoma floods, along the Blanco River which flows through town.

Geography

Cypress Creek joins the Blanco River in Wimberley. Blue Hole and Jacob's Well are located along Cypress Creek.

Climate

The climate in this area is characterized by hot, humid summers and generally mild to cool winters.  According to the Köppen climate classification system, Wimberley has a humid subtropical climate, Cfa on climate maps.

Demographics

As of the 2020 United States census, there were 2,839 people, 1,428 households, and 896 families residing in the city.

As of the census of 2010, there were 2,626 people, 1,145 households, and 726 families residing in the city. There were 1,482 housing units, of which 337, or 22.7%, were vacant. 245 of the vacant units were for seasonal or recreational use. The racial makeup of the city was 93.5% white, 0.5% African American, 1.5% Native American, 0.3% Asian, 2.8% some other race, and 1.5% from two or more races. 11.2% of the population were Hispanic or Latino of any race.

Of the 1,145 households, 21.6% had children under the age of 18 living with them, 53.4% were headed by married couples living together, 7.3% had a female householder with no husband present, and 36.6% were non-families. 30.3% of all households were made up of individuals, and 15.4% were someone living alone who was 65 years of age or older. The average household size was 2.21, and the average family size was 2.72.

In the city, 16.8% of the population were under the age of 18, 4.8% were from 18 to 24, 16.0% from 25 to 44, 35.4% from 45 to 64, and 26.9% were 65 years of age or older. The median age was 52.7 years. For every 100 females, there were 90.8 males. For every 100 females age 18 and over, there were 88.4 males.

For the period 2012–2016, the estimated median annual income for a household was $68,359, and the median income for a family was $88,958. Male full-time workers had a median income of $61,429 versus $38,611 for females. The per capita income for the city was $44,219. 8.8% of the population and 7.5% of families were below the poverty line. 17.3% of the population under the age of 18 and 3.8% of those 65 or older were living in poverty.

Education
Wimberley Public Schools are part of the Wimberley Independent School District. The district has one primary school, one elementary school, one junior high school, and two high schools (Wimberley High School and Katherine Anne Porter School, a public charter high school). Students attend Wimberley High School or Katherine Anne Porter School (HS), Scudder Primary School, Jacob's Well Elementary School and Danforth Junior High School.

Notable people

 Nathan Brown (born 1965), formerly Poet Laureate of Oklahoma, moved to Wimberley, where he now lives
 Bob Decker (1922–1999), Minnesota state senator and educator
 Ray Wylie Hubbard (born 1946), Texas music legend, moved to Wimberley in his early 40s
 Sarah Jarosz (born 1991), bluegrass singer-songwriter and multi-instrumentalist, was raised in Wimberley
 Leon Jaworski (1905–1982), special prosecutor in the Watergate Scandal, died in Wimberley in 1982 while chopping wood at his Circle J Ranch
 Lathan Mckay (born 1978), film and television producer, historian, actor-writer and co-founder of the Evel Knievel Museum moved to Wimberley in his late 30s
 Philip McKeon (1964–2019), former child actor on the TV series Alice, moved to Wimberley in the 2000s and became a co-host on the local radio show The Breakfast Taco on KWVH-LP 94.1FM
 Buck Meek (born 1987), singer-songwriter and guitarist in Big Thief, was raised in Wimberley
 Rupert Neve (1926–2021), British creator of audio recording equipment bearing his name, moved to Wimberley in his 70s
 Kevin Welch (born 1955), singer-songwriter, moved to Wimberley in his early 50s

Further reading

References

External links

 City of Wimberley official website
 Wimberley Valley Chamber of Commerce
 

Cities in Hays County, Texas
Cities in Texas
Former census-designated places in Texas
Cities in Greater Austin
Populated places established in 2000